Thaumatomyia is a genus of flies in the family Chloropidae.

Species
Species within this genus include: 

 Thaumatomyia annulata
 Thaumatomyia apache
 Thaumatomyia appropinqua
 Thaumatomyia bistriata
 Thaumatomyia brasiliensis
 Thaumatomyia cicatricosa
 Thaumatomyia columbiana
 Thaumatomyia convexa
 Thaumatomyia czernyi
 Thaumatomyia egregia
 Thaumatomyia elongatula
 Thaumatomyia flavifrons
 Thaumatomyia gemina
 Thaumatomyia glabra
 Thaumatomyia glabrina
 Thaumatomyia grata
 Thaumatomyia hallandica
 Thaumatomyia himalayensis
 Thaumatomyia indica
 Thaumatomyia longicollis
 Thaumatomyia luteolimbata
 Thaumatomyia megacera
 Thaumatomyia montana
 Thaumatomyia natalensis
 Thaumatomyia nigrescens
 Thaumatomyia nigrifemur
 Thaumatomyia nigriscens
 Thaumatomyia notata
 Thaumatomyia obtusa
 Thaumatomyia oculata
 Thaumatomyia pallida
 Thaumatomyia parviceps
 Thaumatomyia pulla
 Thaumatomyia pullipes
 Thaumatomyia rubida
 Thaumatomyia rubrivittata
 Thaumatomyia rufa
 Thaumatomyia ruficornis
 Thaumatomyia rufithorax
 Thaumatomyia secunda
 Thaumatomyia semicolon
 Thaumatomyia subnotata
 Thaumatomyia sulcifrons
 Thaumatomyia sulfurifrons
 Thaumatomyia trifasciata

References 

 Fauna europaea

Chloropinae
Chloropidae genera